Stirlingshire or the County of Stirling) is a historic county and registration county of Scotland. Its county town is Stirling.

It borders Perthshire to the north, Clackmannanshire and West Lothian to the east, Lanarkshire to the south, and Dunbartonshire to the south-east and south-west (this latter boundary is split in two owing to Dunbartonshire's Cumbernauld exclave).

Coat of arms
The County Council of Stirling was granted a coat of arms by Lord Lyon King of Arms on 29 September 1890.

The design of the arms commemorated the Scottish victory at the Battle of Bannockburn in the county.

On the silver saltire on blue of St Andrew was placed the rampant red lion from the royal arms of Scotland.

Around this were placed two caltraps and two spur-rowels recalling the use of the weapons against the English cavalry.

On the abolition of the Local Government council in 1975, the arms were regranted to the Local Government Stirling District Council.

They were regranted a second time in 1996 to the present Local Government Stirling Council, with the addition of supporters (a goshawk and a wolf).

History

In 1130, Stirling, one of the principal royal strongholds of the Kingdom of Scotland, was created a Royal burgh by King David I.

On 11 September 1297, the forces of Andrew Moray and William Wallace defeated the combined English forces of John de Warenne, 6th Earl of Surrey, and Hugh de Cressingham near Stirling, on the River Forth, at the Battle of Stirling Bridge during the First War of Scottish Independence.

On 22 July 1298 the Battle of Falkirk saw the defeat of William Wallace by King Edward I of England.

On 24 June 1314 the Battle of Bannockburn at Bannockburn, (Blàr Allt a' Bhonnaich in Scottish Gaelic) was a significant Scottish victory in the Wars of Scottish Independence. It was one of the decisive battles of the First War of Scottish Independence.

On 11 June 1488 the Battle of Sauchieburn was fought at the side of Sauchie Burn, a stream about two miles south of Stirling, Stirlingshire, Scotland. The battle was fought between the followers of King James III of Scotland and a large group of rebellious Scottish nobles including Alexander Home, 1st Lord Home, nominally led by the king's 15-year-old son, Prince James, Duke of Rothesay (reigned 1488–1513).

In 1645 the Covenanter army under General William Baillie formed near Banton for their engagement with the Royalist forces under the command of Montrose at the Battle of Kilsyth, Kilsyth, on 15 August 1645; a major battle of the Wars of the Three Kingdoms.

The Battle of Falkirk Muir on 17 January 1746 saw the Jacobites under Charles Edward Stuart defeat a government army commanded by Lieutenant General Henry Hawley.

The Local Government (Scotland) Act 1889 established a uniform system of county councils in Scotland and realigned the boundaries of many of Scotland's counties. Subsequently, Stirlingshire County Council was created in 1890. Stirlingshire County Council was based at based at County Buildings in Barton Street, a structure which was completed in 1875, and then moved to Old Viewforth in 1931.

Geography
Stirlingshire occupies a strategic position on the Forth-Clyde isthmus commanding the main overland routes from Glasgow and Edinburgh up to central and northern Scotland.

The western 'arm' of The county is sparsely populated and dominated by Loch Lomond, which it shares with Dunbartonshire, and the Trossachs (now a national park); Ben Lomond is located here and is the highest point in Stirlingshire at 974 m (3,196 ft), and 9th in Scotland. Several island's within Loch Lomond belong to Stirlingshire, the chief of these being Eilean nan Deargannan, Bucinch, Ceardach, Inchcruin, Inchfad, Ellanderroch, Inchcailloch and Clairinsh. On the north-eastern boundary with Perthshire a small portion of Loch Katrine lies within Stirlingshire, and also the smaller Loch Arklet can be found here.

Central Stirlingshire is dominated by the Carron Valley Reservoir and the Campsie Fells, Kilsyth Hills and Gargunnock Hills, with the larger towns such as Lennoxtown and Kilsyth spread out along the southern border and A891/A803 roads. The south-western corner of the county around Milngavie abuts the Greater Glasgow conurbation and contains several small reservoirs and lochs, such as Burncrooks Reservoir, Kilmannan Reservoir, Carbeth Loch, Craigallian Loch, Dumbrock Loch, Mugdock Loch, Mugdock/Craigmaddie Reservoir and Bardowie Loch.

The area east of the M80 is generally much flatter and contains the bulk of the county's population, with the Firth of Forth providing access to the North Sea.

Transport
The bulk of Stirlingshire's motorway network lies in the eastern third of the county where the population is most concentrated; these include the M80 running north–south and connecting Stirling and Denny to Cumbernauld, and the M9 linking the eastern towns to Edinburgh. Various A roads form a circle around central Stirlingshire, with the rest of the county served by B roads.

Various ferries enable passengers to cross Loch Lomond in the far west, and the Kincardine Bridge in the far east provides access to Fife and Clackmannanshire.

Only the eastern third of the county is connected by rail, with the exception of Milngavie railway station in the far south-west which provides access to Glasgow. The rail lines connect the towns of the eastern conurbation to each other and on to Edinburgh, Glasgow, Cumbernauld and Perth.

Civil parishes

In 2001, according to the website of the General Register Office for Scotland, there were 871 civil parishes. List of civil parishes in Scotland

Civil parishes are still used for some statistical purposes, and separate census figures are published for them. As their areas have been largely unchanged since the 19th century this allows for comparison of population figures over an extended period of time.

Following the boundary changes caused by the Local Government (Scotland) Act 1889, Stirlingshire contained the following civil parishes:

Airth (No.1 on Map A)
Baldernock (2)
Balfron (3)
Bothkennar, Barony of Newton (4)
Buchanan (5)
Campsie (6)
Denny (7)
Drymen (8) 
Dunipace (9)
Falkirk (10)
Fintry (11)
Gargunnock (12)
Killearn (13)
Kilsyth (14)
Kippen (15)
Larbert (16)
Logie (23)
Muiravonside (refer Maddiston) (17) 
Polmont (18)
St. Ninians (19)
Slamannan (20)
Strathblane (21)
Stirling (22)

Burghs

The Royal Burgh of Stirling (from the 12th century) (No. 2 on map)
The Burgh of Bridge of Allan (a police burgh from 1870) (1)
The Burgh of Denny and Dunipace (a police burgh from 1877) (4)
The Burgh of Falkirk (a burgh of barony from 1600, reformed 1832) (5)
The Burgh of Grangemouth (a police burgh from 1877) (6)
The Burgh of Kilsyth (a burgh of barony from 1620, a police burgh from 1878) (3)

In 1930 Falkirk and Stirling became large burghs, taking over some of the duties of the county council. The remaining four burghs became "small burghs", with limited powers.

Towns and villages
Some Stirlingshire towns listed in the Registers of Scotland, Land Register Counties. 

Airth  see Civil Parish
Allandale
Arnprior
Auchenbowie
Auchenreoch
Avonbridge
Bainsford
Balfron
Balmaha
Balmore
Banknock
Bankside
Bannockburn
Banton
Bardowie 
Barnellan
Blairlogie
Blanefield
Bonnybridge
Boquhan
Bothkennar Barony of Newton see Civil Parish
Bridge of Allan see Civil Parish
Brightons
Buchlyvie Burgh of Barony. 1672
California
Callendar Park 
Cambusbarron
Camelon
Carron
Carronshore
Castlecary
Causewayhead
Chartershall
Cornton (CODY) 
Cowie
Craigforth
Craigmill
Craigton
Croftamie
Denny  see Civil Parish
Dennyloanhead
Drip Bridge
Drymen see Civil Parish
Dumgoyne
Dunipace
Dunmore
Falkirk  see Civil Parish
Fallin
Fankerton
Fintry  see Civil Parish
Gargunnock see Civil Parish
Gartness
Glen Village 
Glensburgh
Grangemouth
Haggs
Haughhead
High Bonnybridge
Inversnaid
Kelvinhead
Kersemill
Kildean
Killearn see Civil Parish
Kilsyth see Civil Parish
Kippen  see Civil Parish
Larbert see Civil Parish
Laurieston
Lennoxtown
Letham
Limerigg
Loch Katrine
Logie  see Civil Parish
Longcroft
Maddiston
Milarrochy
Millhall
Old Plean
Old Sauchie
Plean
Polmont  see Civil Parish
Queenzieburn
Raploch
Redding
Reddingmuirhead
Rowardennan
Rumford
Sauchieburn
Shieldhill
Skinflats
Slamannan see Civil Parish
South Alloa
Stirling  see Civil Parish
St Ninians see Civil Parish
Standburn
Strathblane
Stenhousemuir
Stirling
Stoneywood
Strathblane see Civil Parish
Throsk
Torrance
Torwood
Touch
Wallacestone
Westquarter
Whins of Milton
Whitecross

Local government
Until the 1890s the county had two small exclaves: part of the parish of Logie, which was surrounded by Perthshire, and the parish of Alva, locally in Clackmannanshire. The Perthshire part of Logie was added to Stirlingshire, while Alva was annexed by Clackmannanshire.
In 1894 parish Local Government councils were established for the civil parishes, replacing the previous parochial boards.

The Local Government parish councils were in turn superseded by Local Government district councils in 1930.

In 1930 the parishes ceased to be used for local government purposes, and the landward area of the county (the part outside the burghs) was divided into eight Local Government districts.  These Local Government districts were abolished in 1975.
County of Stirling Central No.1
County of Stirling Central No.2 (Denny, Dunipace and Kilsyth areas)
County of Stirling Eastern No.1 (parishes of Airth and Larbert)
County of Stirling Eastern No.2 (Falkirk and Slamannan)
County of Stirling Eastern No.3 (parishes of Polmont and Muiravonside)
County of Stirling Western No.1
County of Stirling Western No.2
County of Stirling Western No.3 (Baldernock, Campsie, Strathblane)

In the 1973 reorganisation of local government in Scotland, most of Stirlingshire was included in the Central Region, with Kilsyth and surrounding area becoming part of the Strathclyde Region.

Since a further reorganisation in 1996, the area has been part of the Local Government council areas of :

Stirling (note that this polity has drastically different boundaries to historic Stirlingshire)
East Dunbartonshire 
Falkirk
North Lanarkshire

Parliamentary constituencies
Following the Act of Union, Stirlingshire returned members to the House of Commons of the Parliament of the United Kingdom from 1708.

1707–1918
The Royal Burgh of Stirling formed part of the Stirling burghs constituency along with burghs in Fife and Perthshire.
The Burgh of Falkirk formed part of Falkirk Burghs, along with burghs in Lanarkshire and Linlithgowshire.
The remainder of the county returned a single member as the parliamentary county of Stirlingshire. The detached parish of Alva was annexed to the constituency of Clackmannanshire and Kinross by the Representation of the People (Scotland) Act 1832.

1918–1975
In 1918 seats in the House of Commons were redistributed. Stirlingshire was thereafter represented by three members of parliament.
The burghs of Stirling, Falkirk and Grangemouth formed the Stirling and Falkirk burghs constituency. in 1974 the constituency was renamed Stirling, Falkirk and Grangemouth.
The eastern part of the county (defined in 1948 and 1970 as the Eastern No. 1, Eastern No. 2 and Eastern No. 3 Districts) was combined with Clackmannanshire to form Clackmannan and East Stirlingshire.
The remainder of the county was included in the constituency of West Stirlingshire (named Stirling and Clackmannan West until 1945). The area included in the constituency was defined in 1948 and 1970 as the burghs of Bridge of Allan, Denny and Dunipace and Kilsyth; and the Central No. 1, Central No. 2, Western No. 1, Western No. 2 and Western No. 3 districts.

These boundaries continued in use until 1983, when new constituencies were formed based on the Local Government regions and districts created in 1975.

List of listed buildings

Notable residents
Michelle Watt, television show host, writer and interior designer.

Gallery

References

External links

William Nimmo's The History of Stirlingshire at Electric Scotland
"The Imperial gazetteer of Scotland". Vol.II. by Rev. John Marius Wilson. https://archive.org/stream/imperialgazettee02wilsuoft#page/n815/mode/1up
Entry on Stirlingshire, from A Topographical Dictionary of Scotland by Samuel Lewis, London, 1846 (British History Online)
Heritage Paths.  http://www.heritagepaths.co.uk/pathdetails.php?path=387
Map of Stirlingshire on Wikishire

 
Counties of Scotland
Counties of the United Kingdom (1801–1922)